The 2021 NCAA Division I Outdoor Track and Field Championships was the 99th NCAA Division I Men's Outdoor Track and Field Championships and the 39th NCAA Division I Women's Outdoor Track and Field Championships held at the reconstructed Hayward Field in Eugene, Oregon on the campus of the University of Oregon. 42 events (21 men's and 21 women's) were contested from Wednesday, June 9 until Saturday, June 12, starting with the men's decathlon and ending with the women's  relay. Men's events were held Wednesday and Friday, and women's events were held Thursday and Saturday, with the exception of the men's decathlon and women's heptathlon which extended into Thursday and Friday respectively.

Streaming and television coverage
ESPN live streamed on ESPN2, ESPN3, and ESPNU.

Results

Men

100 meters

Wind: +0.4 m/s

Results from Flash Results.

200 meters

Wind: -0.4 m/s

Results from Flash Results.

400 meters

Results from Flash Results.

800 meters

Results from Flash Results.

1500 meters

Results from Flash Results.

5000 meters

Results from Flash Results.

10000 meters

Results from Flash Results.

110-meter hurdles

Wind: -0.6 m/s

Results from Flash Results.

400-meter hurdles

Results from Flash Results.

3000-meter steeplechase

Results from Flash Results.

4 × 100-meter relay

Results from Flash Results.

4 × 400-meter relay

Results from Flash Results.

Long jump

Results from Flash Results.

Triple jump

Results from Flash Results.

High jump

Results from Flash Results.

Pole vault

Results from Flash Results.

Shot put

Results from Flash Results.

Discus throw

Results from Flash Results.

Javelin throw

Results from Flash Results.

Hammer throw

Results from Flash Results.

Decathlon

Results from Flash Results.

Women

100 meters

Wind: +2.2 m/s (wind-assisted)

Results from Flash Results.

200 meters

Wind: +0.2 m/s

Results from Flash Results.

400 meters

Results from Flash Results.

800 meters

Results from Flash Results.

1500 meters

Results from Flash Results.

5000 meters

Results from Flash Results.

10000 meters

Results from Flash Results.

100-meter hurdles

Wind: +0.4 m/s

Results from Flash Results.

400-meter hurdles

Results from Flash Results.

3000-meter steeplechase

Results from Flash Results.

4 × 100-meter relay

Results from Flash Results.

4 × 400-meter relay

Results from Flash Results.

Long jump

Triple jump

High jump

Pole vault

Shot put

Discus throw

Javelin throw

Hammer throw

Results from Flash Results.

Heptathlon

Results from Flash Results.

Standings

Men
Only top ten teams shown

Women
Only top ten teams shown

See also
NCAA Men's Division I Outdoor Track and Field Championships
NCAA Women's Division I Outdoor Track and Field Championships
2021 NCAA Division I Indoor Track and Field Championships

References

External links
Start lists and results

NCAA Division I Outdoor Track and Field Championships
NCAA Division I Outdoor Track and Field Championships
NCAA Men's Outdoor Track and Field Championship
NCAA Women's Outdoor Track and Field Championship